George Winans (January 8, 1839 – January 1926) was an American politician and steamboat captain who served as a member of the Wisconsin State Assembly from 1888 to 1890.

Background
Winans was born on January 8, 1839, in Camanche, Iowa. He would become a steamboat owner and captain. Winans was a member of the Assembly during the 1889 session. He was a Democrat. Winans died in January 1926, reports have differed on the exact date. He was buried in Waukesha, Wisconsin.

References

External links

People from Clinton County, Iowa
Politicians from Waukesha, Wisconsin
Steamship captains
1839 births
1926 deaths
Burials in Wisconsin
Democratic Party members of the Wisconsin State Assembly